Chad Chaffin (born July 20, 1968) is an American former stock car racing driver.

Chaffin has raced in all three of NASCAR's major series. He was a two-time track champion at the historic Nashville Speedway USA, where he met his friend, Andy Kirby.

NASCAR career

Sprint Cup
Chad made his Sprint Cup debut in 2004 at Martinsville. Driving the No. 98 MACH 1 Motorsports Ford, he ran 100 laps before experiencing a mechanical failure and finished in 39th place. In 2005, he attempted three races with Front Row Motorsports and MACH 1. Chaffin qualified for the Checker Auto Parts 500 at Phoenix and finished the race in the 43rd position after overheating issues. He began the 2006 season in the No. 92 Oak Gloves Chevrolet driving for Front Row Motorsports, however, he switched to the No. 34 Oak Gloves Chevrolet within the organization after two races. After another eight races, he yet again moved within FRM, this time to the recently acquired No. 61 team. Chaffin has currently made four of the fourteen races he has attempted, three in the No. 34 Oak Gloves Chevrolet and two cars with No. 61 team.

At the beginning of the 2007 season, Chaffin switched to the No. 37 R&J Racing car but was replaced by John Andretti before qualifying for a race. After Mike Bliss' resignation as the driver of the No. 49 BAM Racing Dodge on June 27, 2007, Chaffin was selected as one of the replacements with Larry Foyt. In his first attempt to qualify of the season at Loudon, Chaffin made the race after Brian Vickers and the No. 83 Team Red Bull Toyota were disqualified after failing post-qualifying inspection. In 2008, he attempted to qualify the No. 34 Chevrolet for Front Row Motorsports in the Pennsylvania 500 at Pocono and the Camping World RV 400 at Dover, but failed to qualify in either.

Busch Series
His NASCAR career began in a 1993 Busch Series race at Rockingham. He drove three races in the No. 16 31-W Insulation Chevrolet with a best finish of 29th in his debut. In 1994, he again turned to the No. 16 and had a best finish of 20th in seven races. During 1997 he ran one race in the No. 87 BellSouth Mobility Chevrolet and posted a finish of 19th at Nashville. Again in 1998 he ran one race, this time in a family-owned No. 84 Logan's Roadhouse Ford, where he finished 28th. In 1999, Chaffin made nine starts, three with his family-owned team and six with No. 77 Lear Corporation Ford featuring Tony Hall as the owner. He had a best finish of 9th at Richmond.

Chaffin made 18 starts in 2000, all except for one in the No. 77 Lear Corporation Ford. He posted his best finish again at Richmond with an 11th place. In 2001, he drove for Team Rensi Motorsports and Day Enterprise Racing. Making 14 starts, he would have a best finish of 16th at Atlanta. 2002 is Chaffin's most active year in the Busch Series to date with 26 starts out of the 34 races. The majority of these starts came in the No. 16 31-W Insulation Chevrolet owned by Day Enterprise Racing. Although he struggled to finish many of the races because of mechanical failures he was able to achieve a best finish of 12th at Talladega. Chad was absent from the series for two years before returning for a race in 2005. He finished 36th in his only start during that year. For the 2006 season Chaffin was expected to compete in up to 15 events for Day Enterprise Racing in the No. 05 31-W Insulation Chevrolet, but ended up only making 2 starts for the team, then returned later in the year to make a single start for Sadler Bros. Racing. He has one career Top 10 finish in over 80 starts.

Craftsman Truck Series
Chad first raced in the Craftsman Truck Series in 2000 with three teams. He raced the No. 84 Romeo Guest Associates Ford owned by Long Brothers Racing to his best finish of the season a 3rd at Nashville. He returned in 2001 and again raced with Long Brothers Racing and had a best finish of 4th. In 2002, he started only two races as well and was unable to finish either in a family-owned car. For the next two years he drove the No. 18 Dickies Dodge for Bobby Hamilton Racing and had two wins in 2004 (Dover International Speedway and Indianapolis Raceway Park). He finished a career-best 10th in the final points standings in 2003 and 2004.

In 2005, he drove for three teams and competed in 21 of the 25 races. Chaffin began the season in the No. 30 Germain Racing Toyota and had a best finish of fourth before bring replaced by Todd Bodine. Despite being replaced, Wyler Racing selected Chaffin as their driver and he ran 10 races with them placing 9th as his best finish. Jack Sprague then replaced Chaffin and he was left without a ride. He ran one final race in 2005 with No. 13 ThorSport Racing Chevrolet and finished 13th at Phoenix. For 2006, he was scheduled to drive the No. 40 Chevrolet for Key Motorsports in the opening races of the season, but has since left to focus on his Nextel Cup team. Ryan Moore, a Dale Earnhardt, Inc. development driver, has replaced him as of Charlotte. Chaffin made one start this season in the No. 02 Team Copaxone Chevrolet for Sutton Motorsports. It was announced on July 3 that Chaffin would drive the No. 59 Harris Trucking Ford for HT Motorsports after Steve Park's departure. In 2007 and 2008, Chaffin ran part-time in the No. 40 Chevrolet for Key Motorsports. In 22 combined starts, he earned two top 10 finishes.

ARCA career
Chaffin's only attempt in ARCA came in 2000 with his own Chaffin Motorsports. The No. 92 Upstate Helicopters Ford, which was a '97 Thunderbird, qualified third for Pro2Call 200 at Daytona. He exited the race after a transmission failure on lap 10, leaving him in the 40th position.

Motorsports career results

NASCAR
(key) (Bold – Pole position awarded by qualifying time. Italics – Pole position earned by points standings or practice time. * – Most laps led.)

Sprint Cup Series

Daytona 500

Busch Series

Craftsman Truck Series

ARCA Bondo/Mar-Hyde Series
(key) (Bold – Pole position awarded by qualifying time. Italics – Pole position earned by points standings or practice time. * – Most laps led.)

References

External links
 

1968 births
American Speed Association drivers
Living people
NASCAR drivers
People from Smyrna, Tennessee
CARS Tour drivers
Racing drivers from Tennessee